Prince Iraj Mirza (literally Prince Iraj; October 1874 – 14 March  1926) (titled Jalāl-ol-Mamālek), son of prince Gholam-Hossein Mirza, was a famous Iranian poet. He was a modern poet and his works are associated with the criticism of traditions. He also made translation of literary works from French into Persian.

Early life
 
Iraj was born in October 1874 in Tabriz, northwestern Iran. His pedigree chart shows that he was a great-grandson of Fath Ali Shah Qajar, the second shah of Qajar dynasty (reigned 1797–1834). Iraj's father, prince Gholam-Hossein Mirza was son of prince Malek Iraj Mirza son of Fath Ali Shah Qajar.

Gholam-Hossein Mirza, Iraj's father, was a poet laureate or the official court-poet of Mozaffar al-Din Mirza. Mozaffar al-Din Mirza, the son of Nasser-al-Din Shah (the fourth shah of Qajar dynasty reigned 1848–1896), was the Crown Prince of Iran at the time. (As a tradition, all Crown Princes during Qajar era used to reside in Tabriz).

Though some sources indicate that Iraj was schooled privately, there are reliable evidences that he studied at a branch of the Dārolfonoon (House of Sciences and Techniques) in Tabriz. At 15, he was fluent in Persian, French, Arabic and Azerbaijani. He was also familiar with the art of calligraphy. His handwriting was very artistic and he was and still is considered one of the famous calligraphers of Iran.

Marriage and offices

In 1890, at the age of 16, Iraj got married. When he was 19, both his father and wife died.

He then took the position of his late father and became the court-poet of Mozaffar al-Din Mirza . At 22, when Mozaffar al-Din Mirza acceded to the throne in 1896 and became Mozaffar al-Din Shah; Iraj was titled as the Head of Poets (in Persian: Sadr o-Shoʻarā). He was then titled as Jalāl ol-Mamālek.

Few years later, however, he left the royal court and joined the Tabriz office of Ali Khan Amin al-Dowleh who was the governor of Iranian Azarbaijan. At this time, Iraj learned French and became very familiar with Russian too.

In 1905, when Amino-Dowleh was relocated and moved to Tehran, Iraj also accompanied him and soon became involved in the Persian Constitutional Revolution. In 1907 when Ahmad Ghavam (Qavam os-Saltaneh), a governmental authority, was assigned to go to Europe, Iraj was asked to join him. Two years later, Iraj returned to Tehran where he started to work as a staff member in the Office of Official Compositions (in Persian: Dār ol-ʻenshā).

In 1915, his first son, Ja'afar Gholi Mirza, due to some psychological problems, committed suicide.

In 1917, Iraj joined the newly established Ministry of Culture, and three years later he was transferred to the Ministry of Finance and Revenue. From 1920 to 1925 he worked as a Revenue Officer in Mashhad, the capital city of Khorasan Province (now Razavi Khorasan), in the northeast of Iran.

At 51, Iraj moved back to Tehran where he died from a heartattack on March 14, 1926.

He was survived by his second son, Khosrow Iraj.

Poems

Iraj is considered one of the famous contemporary poets of Iran and also as the first Iranian master of colloquial poetry. In his verses, he uses words from everyday speech. The origin of this tendency has come to be identified with his name. Through Iraj, poetic language was enriched with many colloquial words and expressions. His simple poetic language is also famous for its witticism and satire.

During Qajar era, Iraj was influenced by the Persian Constitutional Revolution (1906–1911) and by the changing circumstances in the country. This fact is manifested in the particular style of poetry that he created. Modern and imported concepts, combined with what were obtained from his own thoughts, form the framework of his style. He criticizes the social conditions of the country, and the striking originality in his use of metaphor when addressing diverse social problems has been admirable by his critics.

His style is rich in the art of simile. His striking sarcasm, pungent and fanged words are pointed at the dishonest clergy, businessmen, merchants and statesmen. In addition to those colloquial poems, Iraj also composed elegies to praise Mozzafar-al-Din Shah, Hassan Ali Khan Garroosy (also known as Amir Nezam Garroosy, the governor of Iranian Azarbaijan (now East Azarbaijan and West Azarbaijan) and Kermanshah during Qajar era), and many other Qajar personalities. His praise never shaded into flattery. Iraj also composed very nice massnawi and qat'aa on the raising and education of children, maternal affection, love and romance.

He was an enlightened and innovative poet, and tended towards European thought.

Despite his famous technical skills, he sometimes used similar cases of rhyme, which is considered by some poetry researchers to be an intentional rejection of strict traditional poetical rules. Although Iraj was one of the pioneers of the innovative movement in Persian poetry, he never thought of abandoning the rules of classical poetry. Some scholars believe that because of the time in which he lived, his depth of literary knowledge and his familiarity with French and other foreign languages, he could also have been one of the masters of free verse if he had wanted to.

He is particularly famous for his pederastic and satirical poetry.

Among many poems that Iraj composed, his well-known poems include Satan (in Persian: Ebleess), Mother (in Persian: Maadar), A Letter to a Poet Aref Ghazvini (in Persian: Arefnameh), Woman's Picture (in Persian: Tassvir-e Zan), Story of the Veil or Hijab (in Persian: hejab) and the Story of Zohreh and Manouchehr (in Persian: Daastan-e Zohreh o Manouchehr), which is based on William Shakespeare's Venus and Adonis.

In Mother, the poet describes a child's affection for his/her mother and how the mother nurtures the child from birth onwards. The words Iraj uses are exquisitely descriptive and lovely not only in its original Persian but even in translated versions.

The Story of Zohreh and Manouchehr is one of his famous poetic works. Here Iraj tells the story based on the Greek myth of Venus and Adonis. In this poem, Zohreh leaves the gods and comes to Earth, where she is overcome by the pleasing charm of Manouchehr in his armor. He rejects her advances, while Zohreh attempts her first seduction. She goes to great pains to explain the beauty of lovemaking, and she finally goes her own way as she returns to the gods.

On December 8, 2004, the last Iranian movies launched in France was The Story of Zohreh and Manouchehr directed by Mitra Farahani. The film had already participated in the Berlin film festival and several other international events and attracted many viewers.

Iraj believed that the status of Iranian women at his time was reminiscent of the Dark Ages. Iraj could not bear to see that life was intolerable, unbearable and miserable for the courageous and valorous women of Iran. That was why he composed the very powerful and memorable pieces of women's daily lives in his poems.

Tomb

His tomb is in Zahir-od-dowleh cemetery between Darband and Tajrish located in Shemiran, north of Tehran.

Works 
 Poems Divan
 Masnavi of Zohre o Manuchehr (in Persian, not completed)
 Masnavi of Arefnameh
 Iraj Literary Works
 Romeo and Juliet (Translation from French)

Notes

References
 Iraj Mirza Jalaalol-Mamalek: A Reference Article on the First Iranian Master of Colloquial Poetry by Manouchehr Saadat Noury
 A survey of biography, thoughts, and works and ancestors of Iraj Mirza, Dr. Mohammad-Ja'far Mahjub, Golshan Printing House, Tehran, 1977
 Mo'in Persian Dictionary, Amir Kabir Publishers, Vol.5,
 From Saba To Nima, Vol. 1, Yahya Aryanpur, Tehran, Zavvar Publishers, Tehran

External links

 Photographs of the grave of Iraj Mirza, Zahir od-Dowleh cemetery: (1), (2).
 "Aman az in Del" sung by Ghamar on Iraj Mirza's death 

Iranian satirists
People of the Persian Constitutional Revolution
1874 births
1926 deaths
Qajar princes
19th-century Iranian poets
20th-century Iranian poets
Iranian male poets
Poets from Tabriz